Dyrk Magz, codenamed Magno, is a fictional character, a superhero in the post-Zero Hour future of the DC Comics universe, and a former member of the Legion of Super-Heroes.

Fictional character biography
Like Legion founder Cosmic Boy, Dyrk Magz was born on the planet Braal, and possessed a high level of the power over magnetism that is natural to all Braalians. He was the first candidate to distinguish himself at the tryouts held by the Legion in Legionnaires #43; although acting leader Live Wire was reluctant to recruit a replacement for Cosmic Boy, who was at the time stranded in the 20th century, Dyrk's quick thinking and willingness to take action earned him a place in the Legion and the codename Magno.

Power loss
His service in the Legion was short-lived. After successfully deterring several rejected applicants' attempt at re-opening the newly filled membership slots, Magno and the other two new recruits, Sensor and Umbra, joined the rest of the Legion in battling Mordru. During the Legion's first encounter with the sorcerer, Magno saved Live Wire's life, but the team was unable to prevent the destruction of the planet Sklar. In the following climactic battle, although Live Wire was able to protect Magno from an energy surge which killed Workforce member Blast-Off, in the aftermath Dyrk's powers of magnetism were entirely gone.   
    
Dyrk chose to return home to Braal, but found that control over magnetism was taken for granted by native Braalians and was a constant reminder of his loss. None of the many specialists he saw there were able to reverse or even explain the loss of his powers. Eventually Live Wire was able to convince him to return to the Legion by offering the newly finished Outpost Allon as a sort of neutral ground.  After the time-lost Legionnaires returned from the 20th century, Dyrk volunteered to stay on as part of the Outpost's support staff, handling monitor duty and the administration of the Outpost.   
    
In this capacity, Dyrk remained with the Legion for some time, appearing only periodically to pass along important information or to be asked for advice by Legionnaires like Star Boy and Ferro when they had concerns about their powers. When a lab accident turned the Legionnaires on the Outpost into Bizarros, the reversal temporarily returned his powers of magnetism at full strength and he referred to himself as the "Legion receptionist and most powerful member", but after Invisible Kid restored him and the other affected Legionnaires to normal he was left powerless once more. Dyrk also developed a crush on XS, and the two of them dated briefly before the onset of the Blight.   
    
Dyrk was instrumental in Brainiac 5's strategy to defeat Tharok when the Fatal Five attacked Outpost Allon, as Tharok had not taken him into consideration and did not bother tracking his movements. When the Blight attacked, however, he was among the Legionnaires taken by it and presumed dead until its defeat.

Science Police
Upon the disbanding of the Legion after the Blight and the loss of Outpost Allon, Dyrk chose to join the Science Police, following in the footsteps of his older brother Omar. He appeared once more in Legion Worlds #3 at the beginning of his assignment to his home planet, unwittingly becoming involved in an operation of the re-forming Legion when he chose to arrest Cosmic Boy for vigilantism, which had at the time been outlawed by the United Planets. Upon learning that Cosmic Boy had intentionally gotten himself arrested in order to steal a new faster-than-light ship to allow the Legion mobility, Dyrk agreed to cover for his former teammate, on the condition that he be brought in on everything when circumstances allowed.   
    
That apparently never came to pass, as Dyrk did not appear again in the post-Zero Hour run of the Legion of Super-Heroes comics, and has not appeared in any subsequent versions of the Legion.

Powers and abilities
Currently none, formerly the ability to generate and control magnetic fields.

References 

DC Comics extraterrestrial superheroes
DC Comics police officers
DC Comics superheroes
Comics characters introduced in 1996
Characters created by Roger Stern
DC Comics metahumans